Radhikapur railway station is a station serving Radhikapur in the Uttar Dinajpur district, West Bengal, India. It is an active rail transit system on the Bangladesh–India border. It is an India–Bangladesh land border checkpoint and has a land customs station for movement of goods. Both Indian and Bangladesh government have been trying to increase connectivity through Radhikapur.

History
Assam Behar State Railway extended the metre-gauge railway from Parbatipur, now in Bangladesh, to Katihar in 1889.
In 1948–50, as a part of the Assam Rail Link project, the Fakiragram–Kishanganj sector was connected to the North Eastern Railway network at Barsoi. The railway lines in the area started being converted to  broad gauge  from the early 1960s. The Barsoi–Radhikapur sector was converted to broad gauge in 2006.
Recorded trade volume in FY 2018-19 was INR 21 crores.

References

External links
  Trains at Radhikapur

Katihar railway division
Railway stations in Uttar Dinajpur district
Railway stations in India opened in 1879